Magdalena Roghman (1637 – 1679), was a Dutch Golden Age engraver.

Biography
She was born in Amsterdamas the sister of Geertruydt and Roelant Roghman. She married Jan Roelof Heister in 1669. She is known from two engravings in the book by Jan Bara called Herstelde vorst, ofte Geluckigh ongeluck, Amsterdam, 1650.

She died in Amsterdam.

References

External links
Magdalena Roghman on historici.nl

1637 births
1679 deaths
Dutch Golden Age printmakers
Artists from Amsterdam
Dutch women artists
17th-century women artists
Women printmakers